John Welborn (born 8 September 1970) is a former Australian rugby union player, who plays at the lock position. He is a former Wallaby. He was the first Western Australian-born player to represent Australia in rugby union, and played six matches for the Wallabies.

Early life
Welborn grew up in Perth and attended Scotch College in Perth for a period of his schooling. After gaining a Bachelor of Commerce degree from the University of Western Australia and representing the state in 15 senior rugby games moved to Sydney in 1992 to follow his ambition of playing rugby for Australia.

Rugby career
In New South Wales John qualified as a chartered accountant and from 1994 to 2000 earned 63 caps for the Waratahs, remaining their most capped second row forward of all time. Representing the Wallabies between 1996 and 1999, John played six tests for Australia and claims he would have played 60 if John Eales had been a back rower. An accomplished rugby traveller John also had successful playing stints with the Sharks in South Africa and the Leicester Tigers in the UK before moving to France where he played five seasons for famous French club Brive. John completed a remarkable rugby odyssey by returning to Perth in 2006 to be a founding player in the Western Force's inaugural season.

Post-rugby career
Since retirement from professional rugby, Welborn has returned to the financial world as an investment banker and now heads Private Client Activities in Western Australia for Investec Bank. He remains connected with rugby as a member of the Fox Sports commentary team and is also a regular rugby columnist for the West Australian Newspaper. John is also the player representative on the board of RugbyWA, an executive committee member of the Rugby Union Players Association, and holds directorships of the Force 15 Foundation and Future Now Learning for Life.

In July 2015 John became Managing Director and CEO of successful gold mining company, Resolute Mining Limited, in Perth Western Australia.

Notes

External links
Stats on It's Rugby
WA Rugby profile

1970 births
Living people
Australia international rugby union players
Australian rugby union players
Leicester Tigers players
People educated at Scotch College, Perth
Rugby union locks
Rugby union players from Perth, Western Australia